Defending champion Martina Hingis and her partner Mirjana Lučić defeated the other defending champion Natasha Zvereva and her partner Lindsay Davenport in the final, 6–4, 2–6, 6–3 to win the women's doubles tennis title at the 1998 Australian Open. It was the first step in an eventual Grand Slam for Hingis.

Seeds
Champion seeds are indicated in bold text while text in italics indicates the round in which those seeds were eliminated.

Draw

Finals

Top half

Section 1

Section 2

Bottom half

Section 3

Section 4

External links
 1998 Australian Open – Women's draws and results at the International Tennis Federation

Women's Doubles
Australian Open (tennis) by year – Women's doubles
1998 in Australian women's sport